Konstantin Petrovich Feoktistov (7 February 1926 – 21 November 2009) was a Soviet cosmonaut and an eminent space engineer.  As a cosmonaut Feoktistov flew on Voskhod 1, the first spacecraft to carry three crew members.  Feoktistov also wrote several books on space technology and exploration. The Feoktistov crater on the far side of the Moon is named in his honor.

Biography 
During the Nazi occupation of Voronezh, at the age of just 16, Feoktistov fought with the Soviet Army against the German troops, carrying out reconnaissance missions for the Voronezh Front. After being captured by a Waffen-SS Army patrol, Feoktistov was shot by a German officer. However, the bullet went right through his chin and neck and did not kill him. Feoktistov was able to crawl out later and then make his way to the Soviet lines.

After the war was over, Feoktistov enrolled in the Bauman Moscow Higher Technical School as an engineering student and he graduated in 1949. Feoktistov also later earned a doctorate in physics. He joined Mikhail Tikhonravov's OKB (design bureau), and in 1955, Feoktistov formed part of the team that went on to design the Sputnik satellites, the Vostok space capsule, the Voskhod space capsule, and the Soyuz space capsule under the leadership of the Soviet Chief Designer Sergey Korolev. During this time, Feoktistov also worked on a design for an ion-propelled spacecraft to be capable of taking humans to Mars.

In 1964, Feoktistov was selected as part of a group of engineers for cosmonaut training, and in October of that very same year, he was hastily assigned to the multi-disciplinary Voskhod 1 crew. He was the first civilian to make a space flight, and the only cosmonaut in the Soviet Union who was not a member of the Communist Party of the Soviet Union. During his space flight, he spent just over 24 hours and 17 minutes in space.

After the flight of Voskhod 1, Feoktistov's training for any further space mission was discontinued for medical reasons. However, Feoktistov continued his outer space engineering work, and he later became the head of the Soviet space design bureau that designed the Salyut and Mir space stations.

In October 1969, Konstantin Feoktistov and Georgi Beregovoi traveled as guests of NASA throughout the US, visiting any city they chose and Disneyland in California – they were joined on the trip by US astronauts as hosts, including Eugene Cernan, Neil Armstrong and others. Kirk Douglas and others hosted receptions for them in Hollywood – they were protected by special agents of the US State Department on request of NASA.  Almost every place they went when accompanied by Eugene Cernan, if a band was present  the song "Fly Me to the Moon" was played – when they visited Disneyland they enjoyed the ride Trip To The Moon, then joked with the US astronauts that they went to Disneyland and not the Moon.  It was a trip that all enjoyed and international friendships were made.
Feoktistov resigned from his engineering position with Energia and then returned to Bauman Moscow Higher Technical School as a professor in 1990.

Honours and awards
Hero of the Soviet Union
Title Pilot-Cosmonaut of the USSR
Order of Lenin
Two Orders of the Patriotic War 1st class
Two Orders of the Red Banner of Labour
Order of the Badge of Honour
Medal "For the Victory over Germany in the Great Patriotic War 1941–1945"
Medal "For the Development of Virgin Lands"
State Prize of the USSR
Lenin Prize
Hero of Socialist Labour (Vietnam)

Note

References

Further reading

 "Rockets and people" – B. E. Chertok, M: "mechanical engineering", 1999.  
 A.I. Ostashev, Sergey Pavlovich Korolyov - The Genius of the 20th Century — 2010 M. of Public Educational Institution of Higher Professional Training MGUL .
 "S. P. Korolev. Encyclopedia of life and creativity" - edited by C. A. Lopota, RSC Energia. S. P. Korolev, 2014 
 The official website of the city administration Baikonur - Honorary citizens of Baikonur

1926 births
2009 deaths
Execution survivors
People from Voronezh
1964 in spaceflight
Bauman Moscow State Technical University alumni
Burials in Troyekurovskoye Cemetery
Heroes of the Soviet Union
Soviet cosmonauts
Soviet engineers
20th-century Russian engineers
Soviet people of World War II
Soviet prisoners of war
Employees of RSC Energia
Recipients of the Medal of Zhukov
Lenin Prize winners
Recipients of the USSR State Prize
Soviet space program personnel
Soviet spaceflight pioneers
Voskhod program cosmonauts